The Taiwanese Ambassador to Tuvalu is the official representative of the Republic of China to Tuvalu.

List of representatives

References 

Tuvalu
China